The term property ladder, widely used in the United Kingdom, describes the relative differences in constant terms from cheaper to more expensive housing.

According to this metaphor, an individual or a family can progress by stages from more affordable houses (for younger first-time buyers who are typically at the bottom of the property ladder) to expensive houses are at the top.  "Getting on to the property ladder" is the process of buying one's first house and holding a place on the property market.

The Oxford English Dictionary traces use of the phrase "property ladder" back to 1941 in the journal Eugenics.

See also
Real estate bubble
British property bubble
United States housing bubble
Priced Out

References 

Real estate in the United Kingdom